Martin Schmidt (born 12 April 1967) is a Swiss professional football manager and current sporting director of 1. FSV Mainz 05.

Coaching career

Early career
Schmidt began his coaching career as an assistant coach at FC Raron and the youth team of FC Thun. On 30 March 2010, he signed a contract with 1. FSV Mainz 05 II, valid until 2013. He extended his contract until 2015 on 21 February 2013.

Mainz 05
Schmidt became new head coach of 1. FSV Mainz 05 on 17 February 2015 after Kasper Hjulmand had been sacked. His contract was extended until 2018 on 21 April 2015. On 22 May 2017, it was announced that his contract with Mainz 05 was dissolved prematurely in accordance with the club's board.

VfL Wolfsburg
Immediately after Andries Jonker was sacked in September 2017, Schmidt was appointed manager of the club. On 19 February 2018, Schmidt resigned effective immediately.

FC Augsburg
He was appointed as the new head coach of FC Augsburg on 9 April 2019. He was sacked on 9 March 2020 following a 2–0 defeat to Bayern Munich.

Back to Mainz 05
On 28 December 2020 it was confirmed, that Schmidt had returned to 1. FSV Mainz 05, however, this time as a sporting director.

Personal life
Schmidt was a part-time auto mechanic before becoming manager.

Managerial statistics

References

External links
Profile at scoreway.com

1967 births
Swiss men's footballers
Swiss football managers
Living people
3. Liga managers
1. FSV Mainz 05 managers
VfL Wolfsburg managers
FC Augsburg managers
Bundesliga managers
Expatriate football managers in Germany
Swiss expatriate sportspeople in Germany
1. FSV Mainz 05 II managers
Association football midfielders